The La Hitte system, named after the French general Ducos, Count de La Hitte, was an artillery system designed in March 1858 to implement rifled muzzle-loading guns in the French Army.

Conception
The La Hitte system was developed through the collaborative work of Lieutenant-colonel Treuille de Beaulieu ("Directeur de l'atelier de précision") who had developed the principle and General de La Hitte ("Président du Comité d'Artillerie") who had implemented it:

Specifications

The new rifled guns were used from 1859 during the Franco-Austrian War in Italy. These guns were a considerable improvement over the previous smooth-bore guns which had been in use. They were able to shoot at 3,000 meters either regular shells, ball-loaded shells or grapeshot. They appear to have been the first examples of rifled cannons used on a battlefield.

The system was muzzle-loading, and the shells could only be detonated at one of two set distances. The shells, based on the 1847 invention of Captain Tamisier, were oval-shaped, and had small protrusions to follow the grooves of the bore. Previous guns, such as the Canon obusier de 12, were rifled to accommodate the system. The system included newly-rifled siege guns of 12, 16 and 24 cm bore, new field guns of 4 and 12 cm bore, new siege guns of 12 and 24 cm bore, and a mountain gun of 4 cm bore.

Change in meaning of gun designations
With the introduction of rifling and elongated shells replacing the old roundshot, guns could fire projectiles of nearly twice the previous weight possible for a given bore (calibre). The rifling gave a far greater range for a given propellant charge, hence a minimal increase in gunpowder was needed for the heavier shells. While the La Hitte guns retained the traditional 4 designation, the number now approximated to kg rather than the livre (French pound) as previously. Hence the Canon de campagne de 4 La Hitte fired a shell weighing nearly 4 kg.

Obsolescence
The La Hitte system was superseded in 1870 with the work of Jean-Baptiste Verchère de Reffye and the development of breech-loading rifled guns.

Image gallery

References 

Artillery of France
American Civil War artillery
Second French intervention in Mexico